Jan Kasielski (born 14 November 1954) is a Polish luger. He competed in the men's singles and doubles events at the 1976 Winter Olympics.

References

1954 births
Living people
Polish male lugers
Olympic lugers of Poland
Lugers at the 1976 Winter Olympics
People from Karkonosze County